Jung Bi-Won (born 15 January 1960) is a retired South Korean boxer who was the IBF Flyweight champion from 27 April 1986 to 2 August 1986. Jung made his professional debut against Sun-Tae Lee on 27 February 1982 at the Munhwa Gymnasium in Seoul.

References 

Living people
1960 births
South Korean boxers
International Boxing Federation champions
Flyweight boxers